Mishicot is a town in Manitowoc County, Wisconsin, United States. The population was 1,409 at the 2000 census. The Village of Mishicot is located within the town. The unincorporated communities of Fisherville, Kingsbridge, and Tisch Mills are also located partially in the town.

Geography
According to the United States Census Bureau, the town has a total area of 27.6 square miles (71.6 km2), of which, 27.6 square miles (71.6 km2) of it is land and 0.04 square miles (0.1 km2) of it (0.07%) is water.

Demographics
As of the census of 2000, there were 1,409 people, 474 households, and 383 families residing in the town. The population density was 51.0 people per square mile (19.7/km2). There were 489 housing units at an average density of 17.7 per square mile (6.8/km2). The racial makeup of the town was 97.87% White, 0.14% Black or African American, 0.14% Native American, 0.21% Asian, 0.78% from other races, and 0.85% from two or more races. Hispanic or Latino of any race were 1.77% of the population.

There were 474 households, out of which 42.2% had children under the age of 18 living with them, 72.6% were married couples living together, 3.8% had a female householder with no husband present, and 19.0% were non-families. 15.0% of all households were made up of individuals, and 4.4% had someone living alone who was 65 years of age or older. The average household size was 2.97 and the average family size was 3.32.

In the town, the population was spread out, with 31.1% under the age of 18, 6.1% from 18 to 24, 30.2% from 25 to 44, 23.4% from 45 to 64, and 9.2% who were 65 years of age or older. The median age was 36 years. For every 100 females, there were 106.6 males. For every 100 females age 18 and over, there were 108.4 males.

The median income for a household in the town was $51,083, and the median income for a family was $55,682. Males had a median income of $36,051 versus $25,313 for females. The per capita income for the town was $17,879. About 6.1% of families and 8.1% of the population were below the poverty line, including 10.4% of those under age 18 and 8.1% of those age 65 or over.

Notable people

 Anton G. Schauer, Wisconsin State Representative, was born in the town
 Ira P. Smith, Wisconsin State Representative, lived in the town
 Charles Tisch, Wisconsin State Representative, lived in the town
 William F. Tisch, Wisconsin State Representative, lived in the town

References

External links
Town of Mishicot
Mishicot Chamber of Commerce

Towns in Manitowoc County, Wisconsin
Towns in Wisconsin